Bank-e-Millie Afghan (BMA) was the first financial institution in Afghanistan, which opened in 1933 by Herati businessman Abdul Majid Zabuli. It was established as a public-private partnership, with a 72 percent share held by the private sector. BMA was instrumental in introducing formal banking services to the people and government.

In 1976, BMA was fully nationalized by the government of Afghanistan. BMA has 15 city branches in Kabul, along with 22 provincial branches.

History 
In 1933, the Bank-e-Millie Afghan (BMA) became Afghanistan's first financial institution. Likewise, it was the first financial institution to be founded as part of a public-private partnership, with the private sector owning 72 percent of the shares. As the country's first bank, BMA provided formal banking services to the citizens and government of the Islamic Republic of Afghanistan. Since then, the bank has relied on its solid capital basis and established trustworthiness to maintain its competitive strength and market leadership ideology. It was totally nationalised by the Afghan government in 1976. BMA has been a leader in offering innovative and safe financial services since its inception. The bank's top priority is to protect depositor funds. Simultaneously, the bank is making a contribution to the country's industry, agricultural, services, and international trade development. In Kabul, BMA has 15 city branches, 22 provincial branches, two counters, and equity investments in the United States and England. It is also commemorating its 89th anniversary of fame.

External links 
 Official Website

References 

Banks of Afghanistan
Banks established in 1933